Kosovo B Power Station is the largest power station in Obilić, Kosovo.

History
Kosovo B Power Station was opened in 1983. It was operated by EPS Surface Mining Kosovo and EPS TPP Kosovo until the end of Kosovo War. After UNMIK administration was established in Kosovo on 1 July 1999, Elektroprivreda Srbije (EPS) lost its access to the local coal mines and power plants, including Kosovo A and Kosovo B power plants.

Since then, it is operated by Kosovo Energy Corporation.

See also 

 Kosovo A Power Station
 Electrical energy in Kosovo

Notes

References

External links 
 http://issuu.com/lptap/docs/tpp-task-4-environmental-and-social-impact

Coal-fired power stations in Kosovo